The Tigre Hotel was an Argentine hotel that stood on the banks of the Luján River, in Paseo Victorica, Tigre,  north of Buenos Aires city.

History
The idea of constructing a hotel in Tigre (then named "Las Conchas") came from a group of rowing enthusiasts who met at the "Pulpería del Portugués" of Buenos Aires in February 1870. Besides, several rowing clubs (such as Buenos Aires R.C.) would then establish their headquarters in the area. After searching for a vacant land, they finally found one located near the confluences of Reconquista and Luján.

The hotel was designed by the engineer Emilio Mitre (son of the Argentine president Bartolomé Mitre) and financed by Mitre himself with Ernesto Tornquist and Luis García. Works began in 1873 and the hotel was finally inaugurated on February 12, 1890. It soon became an important social, tourist and sporting centre, not only for the people of Tigre, but also for porteños. The hotel had 3 floors, an elevator and 50 rooms (all of them heated) with a ground floor dining room seating 200 people. There were salons for smoking, billiards, and for ladies. The hotel had a coffeehouse, tennis courts, a cricket pitch, an area for roller skating, and there was a garage for cars.

In November 1892 the proprietors requested the Municipality of Tigre permission to organise regattas on Sunday and holidays. Three years later the hotel was authorised to open a casino. By those times, services also included evenings with fireworks, a permanent orchestra and other attractions on the banks of Luján River. An Andalusian Patio and a winter garden were constructed afterwards.

At the end of the 19th century, Ludovico Schafer and E.E. Fischer acquired Tigre Hotel. The house was re-opened in 1895 with an inaugural big lunch. Some of the changes made by the new owners included the suppression of the roulette room.

In 1916 various repairs and improvements were made to the building at the height of the Belle Époque as the hotel became the place where the elite of society of the time met and stayed and was famous for its dancing parties. The economic crisis in the 1930s took its toll and in February 1939 the hotel closed its doors definitely. One year later the building was destroyed by fire and subsequently demolished. The place where the Tigre Hotel had stood remained abandoned, until the Tigre City Council building was constructed there, next to Tigre Club (nowadays the Tigre Art Museum).

In popular culture
Today there is sometimes a confusion between the Tigre Hotel and the Tigre Club that was built next to the Hotel in 1912 and is still standing. Following its 1979 designation as a National Historic Monument, a decade of refurbishments ensued. The Tigre Art Museum was opened in 2006.

Bibliography 
 Graciela Clemente, Tigre y Delta, Grijalbo Mondadori, Buenos Aires, 2004.

References

Hotel buildings completed in 1890
Defunct hotels in Argentina
Tigre, Buenos Aires
Demolished hotels
Buildings and structures in Buenos Aires Province
Buildings and structures demolished in 1940
Demolished buildings and structures in Argentina